Le Mesnil-Saint-Jean is a commune in the Eure department in Normandy in northern France. It was established on 1 January 2019 by merger of the former communes of Saint-Georges-du-Mesnil (the seat) and Saint-Jean-de-la-Léqueraye.

See also
Communes of the Eure department

References

Communes of Eure
States and territories established in 2019